Bartłomiej "Bartek" Kasprzykowski (born 19 May 1977) is a Polish actor. He participated in Taniec z gwiazdami, the Polish version of Dancing with the Stars. He also won the fourth edition of Twoja twarz brzmi znajomo - the Polish version of Your Face Sounds Familiar.

Actor 
 1998: Syzyfowe prace − as Andrzej Radek
 1999: Świat według Kiepskich − as a policeman (episode 22)
 2000: Syzyfowe prace − as Andrzej Radek
 2000: Nie ma zmiłuj − as Rysiek, a salesman
 2005: Karol - człowiek, który został papieżem − as cpt. Łukowski
 2005–2007: Magda M. − as Wojciech Płaska
 2007: Hania − as Janek Gabriel, Ola's friend
 2007: Niania − as Bartek (odc. 82)
 2007: Halo Hans! − Karol vel Jan Kos vel Hans Klopss, agent J-24
 2008–2009: Teraz albo nigdy! − as Robert Orkisz, Marta's husband
 2008–2016: Ranczo − as Father Robert
 2009: Grzeszni i bogaci − as Rodżer Blejk
 2009: Dom nad rozlewiskiem − as the dentist Janusz Lisowski
 2010: Duch w dom − as dentist (episode 1)
 2010: Milczenie jest złotem − as Jurek
 2011: Wszyscy kochają Romana − as Roman
 2011: Życie nad rozlewiskiem − as the dentist Janusz Lisowski (episode 8)
 2012: Na dobre i na złe − as Wywrocki (episode 472)

Dubbing 
 2008: Asterix na olimpiadzie − as Mordikus
 2010: Toy Story 3 − as Ken

References 

1977 births
Living people
Polish male television actors
Polish male voice actors
Actors from Szczecin